Heravi Metro Station is a station in line 3 of the Tehran Metro. It is located on Sayyad Expressway at not far from Heravi Sq. in Northwestern Tehran. The station is across from Golestan Hospital.

References

Tehran Metro stations
Railway stations opened in 2017
2017 establishments in Iran